Podveky is a municipality and village in Kutná Hora District in the Central Bohemian Region of the Czech Republic. It has about 200 inhabitants.

Administrative parts
Villages of Ježovice, Útěchvosty and Zalíbená are administrative parts of Podveky.

References

Villages in Kutná Hora District